Euseius andrei is a species of mite in the family Phytoseiidae.

References

andrei
Articles created by Qbugbot
Animals described in 1988